Naegelen is a French surname.

List of people with the surname 

 Christophe Naegelen (born 1983), French politician
 Denis Naegelen (born 1952), French tennis player
 Marcel-Edmond Naegelen (1892–1978), French politician

See also 
 Naegle

Surnames
Surnames of French origin
French-language surnames